Timothy App (born 1947) is a contemporary American painter whose works are in numerous private and public collections including the Baltimore Museum of Art.

Biography
Timothy App attended Kent State University in Ohio, where he received a BFA degree in painting in 1970.  He continued his study of painting at Tyler School of Art of Temple University and in 1974 received an MFA.  During his thirty-two years of teaching, he has taught at Pomona College in California, the University of New Mexico in Albuquerque, and since 1990 at MICA.  With many one-person and group exhibitions, he has shown his abstract paintings regionally, nationally, and abroad.  In 1988, his work was the focus of a 20-year survey exhibition.  Most recently, his work from the last seven years was the subject of an exhibition with a catalog at Goya Contemporary in Baltimore, where his paintings and prints are represented.  His work is included in many private and public collections.  He is a recipient of a NEA fellowship in painting, as well as an individual artist's grant from the Maryland State Arts Council.  Twice he has received the Trustee's Award for Excellence in Teaching at MICA, and has been nominated for the Richard C. Diebenkorn Teaching Fellowship.  In addition to teaching and painting, he has written on the work of other artists, lectured on his own work, and curated exhibitions of abstract painting.

See also
 Abstract painting

References

https://web.archive.org/web/20140101202556/http://citypaper.com/arts/visualart/there-8217-s-an-app-for-that-1.1492814

Bibliography
 MICA Faculty Directory, Timothy App (2009).
 The Goya Contemporary, Timothy App (2009).

External links

An Interview with Artist Timothy App by Julie Karabenick,<Geoform, November 2006.> 

Minimalist artists
20th-century American painters
20th-century American male artists
American male painters
21st-century American painters
21st-century American male artists
Modern painters
Artists from New York (state)
Artists from Akron, Ohio
1948 births
Kent State University alumni
Temple University Tyler School of Art alumni
Pomona College faculty
University of New Mexico faculty
Living people